Victor Lance Vescovo (born 1966) is an American private equity investor, retired naval officer, space tourist and undersea explorer. 
He is a co-founder and managing partner of private equity company Insight Equity Holdings. Vescovo achieved the Explorers Grand Slam by reaching the North and South Poles and climbing the Seven Summits, and he then visited the deepest points of all Earth's five oceans during the Five Deeps Expedition of 2018–2019.

Early life 
Vescovo grew up in Dallas, Texas, where he graduated from St. Mark's School of Texas. He earned a bachelor's degree in Economics and Political Science from Stanford University, a master's degree in Defense and Arms Control Studies (Political Science) from the Massachusetts Institute of Technology, and an MBA from Harvard Business School where he was a Baker scholar.

Military service 

Vescovo served 20 years in the U.S. Navy Reserve as an intelligence officer, retiring in 2013 as a Commander (O-5).

Five Deeps Expedition 

In 2018, Vescovo launched the Five Deeps Expedition, whose objective was to dive to the deepest location in all five of the world's oceans by the end of September 2019. This expedition was filmed in the documentary television series Expedition Deep Ocean. This objective was achieved one month ahead of schedule, and the expedition's team carried out biological samplings and depth confirmations at each location. Besides the deepest points of the five world oceans, the expedition also made dives in the Horizon Deep and the Sirena Deep, and mapped the Diamantina Fracture Zone.

On February 4, 2019, he became the first person to reach the bottom of the Southern Ocean, in the southern portion of the South Sandwich Trench. For this attempt, the expedition used a Kongsberg EM124 multibeam sonar system to achieve accurate mapping of the trench.

On April 16, 2019, Vescovo dived to the bottom of the Sunda Trench south of Bali, reaching the bottom of the Indian Ocean. Likewise, this was done aboard the Limiting Factor. The team reported sightings of what they believed to be species new to science, including a hadal snailfish and a gelatinous organism believed to be a stalked ascidean. The same dive was later undertaken by Patrick Lahey, President of Triton Submarines, and the expedition's chief scientist, Dr. Alan Jamieson. This dive was organised subsequent to the scanning of the Diamantina Fracture Zone using multibeam sonar, confirming that the Sunda Trench was deeper and settling the debate about where the deepest point in the Indian Ocean is.

Diving for a second time on May 1, he became the first person to dive the Challenger Deep twice, finding "at least three new species of marine animals" and "some sort of plastic waste".
On May 7, 2019, Vescovo and Jamieson made the first human-occupied deep submersible dive to the bottom of the Sirena Deep, the third deepest point in the ocean lying about 128 miles northeast from Challenger Deep. The time they spent there was 176 minutes; among the samples they retrieved was a piece of mantle rock from the western slope of the Mariana Trench.

In doing so, Vescovo had descended to the first, second, and third deepest points in the ocean. Unlike the Sunda and Mariana Trenches, no signs of human contamination were found in the deep, which was described by the expedition as "completely pristine".

He was the first human to reach this location.

Maritime history exploration 

In 2019, Vescovo escorted Titanic-historian Parks Stephenson to the wreck of the RMS Titanic for the first revisit of the wreck in 15 years. Findings included continued extensive corrosion and bacterial growth on iron and steel surfaces.

In February 2020, Vescovo piloted his deep diving submersible twice to the wreck of the French submarine Minerve in the Mediterranean Sea. The retired French Rear Admiral Jean-Louis Barbier investigated the wreck of the Minerve on the first dive. On the second dive, Vescovo was accompanied by Hervé Fauve, the son of the captain of the sunken submarine. They placed a commemorative plaque at the wreck.

The Johnston was sunk during the Battle off Samar (1944) in one of the most lopsided naval battles in history.

World records 

In 2019, Victor Vescovo was recognized by Guinness World Records as the person who has covered the greatest vertical distance without leaving Earth's surface. As part of achieving the Explorers Grand Slam (Last Degree), Vescovo climbed Mount Everest on 24 May 2010, Earth's highest point.

Vescovo completed the Explorers Grand Slam (Last Degree) by climbing the highest peak on each of the seven continents, and skied the Last Degree of Latitude at both the North and South Poles. Uniquely, with the successful completion of his Five Deeps Expedition, Vescovo has also dived the deepest point in each of the five world's oceans. He is the first human to have reached the bottom of the Puerto Rico Trench, the Sunda Trench, the Molloy Deep, the Sirena Deep, the Horizon Deep, and the deepest point of the Southern Ocean, which lies in the southern end of the South Sandwich Trench. He is also the first to have dived the Challenger Deep more than once, doing so fifteen times, as well as the first to have visited all four of the ocean's 10,000+ meter deepest points: the Challenger Deep/Mariana Trench, Horizon Deep/Tonga Trench, Scholl Deep/Kermadec Trench, and Galathea Deep/Philippine Trench.

In June, 2020 Vescovo returned to the Challenger Deep, specially equipped to survey its three, well-defined basins, or "pools". Carrying three CTDs on his submersible Limiting Factor as well as one CTD and one depthometer on each of his three independent robotic "landers". Vescovo piloted six passengers to the bottom of the Challenger Deep. These included former astronaut and NOAA Administrator Kathryn Sullivan, the first woman to ultimate depth; Kelly Walsh, the son of Don Walsh (who with Jacques Piccard made the first dive into the Challenger Deep) to become the only father/son team to make this journey albeit 60 years apart; and Vanessa O'Brien, the first woman to both climb Everest and also descend to the bottom of the seafloor (Vescovo was the first person). At the end of his 2022 dives, Vescovo had the unique record of fifteen total dives to Challenger Deep, including the record for the deepest dive in history on April 28, 2019.

Space flight 

Vescovo flew to space onboard New Shepard, as part of the Blue Origin NS-21 mission in 2022. Forbes has recognized Vescovo as the "First To Climb Everest, Visit Ocean’s Deepest Depth And Fly To The Final Frontier.

See also 
 Explorers Grand Slam
 Ocean Explorers Grand Slam
 List of people who descended to Challenger Deep

References

External links 
 The Five Deeps Expedition official website
 

Living people
Private equity and venture capital investors
American company founders
Stanford University alumni
MIT School of Humanities, Arts, and Social Sciences alumni
Harvard Business School alumni
1966 births
People from Dallas
People who have flown in suborbital spaceflight
New Shepard passengers